Andrea Stojadinov (born 20 June 2000) is a Serbian judoka. She won the silver medal in the women's 48 kg event at the 2020 European Judo Championships held in Prague, Czech Republic.

Career
She represented Serbia at the 2018 Mediterranean Games held in Tarragona, Catalonia, Spain. In that same year, she won the gold medal in the women's 48 kg event at the 2018 European U23 Judo Championships held in Győr, Hungary. A year later, she won one of the bronze medals in this event at the 2019 European U23 Judo Championships held in Izhevsk, Russia.

In 2019, she represented Serbia at the European Games held in Minsk, Belarus. She competed in the women's 48 kg event where she was eliminated in her second match by Maruša Štangar of Slovenia. Štangar went on to win one of the bronze medals. A year later, she won one of the bronze medals in the women's 48 kg event at the 2020 Judo Grand Slam Hungary held in Budapest, Hungary.

In 2021, she competed in the women's 48 kg event at the Judo World Masters held in Doha, Qatar. A month later, she won one of the bronze medals in her event at the 2021 Judo Grand Slam Tel Aviv held in Tel Aviv, Israel.

Achievements

References

External links
 
 
 

Living people
2000 births
Place of birth missing (living people)
Serbian female judoka
Mediterranean Games competitors for Serbia
Competitors at the 2018 Mediterranean Games
European Games competitors for Serbia
Judoka at the 2019 European Games
21st-century Serbian women